Thrichomys laurentius, the Sao Lourenço punaré, is a South American caviomorph rodent of the spiny rat family. It was formerly considered a subspecies of T apereoides. It is found in the northern Caatinga ecoregion of northeastern Brazil, a region of dry tropical forest and scrub, at elevations from 15 to 800 m. Little is known about its population trends and threats.

References

Thrichomys
Mammals described in 1904
Taxa named by Oldfield Thomas
Mammals of Brazil